Kings Ferry Bridge North Halt on the Isle of Sheppey in the English county of Kent, was a temporary railway station opened in December 1922 and closed on 1 November 1923.

History
On 17 December 1922, the Norwegian cargo ship  collided with the Kingsferry Bridge, rendering it unfit to carry rail traffic. This disrupted journeys between the Isle of Sheppey and the mainland.

On the mainland Kings Ferry Bridge staff halt was renamed Swale Halt and opened to the public. A temporary halt was built north of the bridge, named Kings Ferry Bridge North Halt. Passengers had to walk over the bridge in order to continue their journeys. The bridge was eventually repaired, and through rail services were restored on 1 November 1923, and this station closed on this date.

References
 

Disused railway stations in Kent
Former London, Chatham and Dover Railway stations
Railway stations in Great Britain opened in 1922
Railway stations in Great Britain closed in 1923
Isle of Sheppey